1 Kings 4 is the fourth chapter of the Books of Kings in the Hebrew Bible or the First Book of Kings in the Old Testament of the Christian Bible. The book is a compilation of various annals recording the acts of the kings of Israel and Judah by a Deuteronomic compiler in the seventh century BCE, with a supplement added in the sixth century BCE. This chapter belongs to the section focusing on the reign of Solomon over the unified kingdom of Judah and Israel (1 Kings 1 to 11). The focus of this chapter is the reign of Solomon, the king of Israel.

Text
This chapter was originally written in the Hebrew language and since the 16th century is divided into 34 verses.

Textual witnesses
Some early manuscripts containing the text of this chapter in Hebrew are of the Masoretic Text tradition, which includes the Codex Cairensis (895), Aleppo Codex (10th century), and Codex Leningradensis (1008). 

There is also a translation into Koine Greek known as the Septuagint, made in the last few centuries BCE. Extant ancient manuscripts of the Septuagint version include Codex Vaticanus (B; B; 4th century) and Codex Alexandrinus (A; A; 5th century).

Analysis
The structure of the first 28 verses of this chapter centers on the abundant provision of Solomon's table:

A  Solomon's royal officials and officers (4:1–19)
 B  Judah and Israel eat, drink and rejoice (4:20)
C  Solomon rules over kingdoms between the Euphrates and Egypt (4:21)
D Provisions of Solomon's table (4:22–23)
C' Solomon rules over kingdoms between the Euphrates and Egypt (4:24)
B' Judah and Israel are living in safety (4:25)
A' Officers provide for Solomon's household (4:26–28)

The section starting from 1 Kings 4:29 to 1 Kings 5:12 is organized as a chiasm:
A  Solomon's wisdom (4:29–34)
 B  Hiram sends servants to Solomon  (5:1)
C  Solomon's message to Hiram (5:2–6)
B' Hiram's response to Solomon (5:7–11)
A' Solomon's wisdom (5:12)

Solomon's royal officials and officers (4:1–19)
The orderly structure of the kingdom shows the quality of Solomon's wisdom, resulting in happy and prosperous citizens, fulfilling not only the Abrahamic promise (Genesis 22:17), but also the fruit of Joshua's conquest (Joshua 11:23). A comparison with David's list of officers (2 Samuel 8:16–18; 20:23–26) demonstrate the continuity and development of the court, with the increase of the number of ministers: some remained (Ado[ni]ram] and Jehoshaphat), some removed (Joab and Abiathar), one promoted (Benaiah), and some as rewards to his party followers (Zadok's son, Azariah, and Nathan's sons in verse 5). Provincial governors were assigned in the twelve provinces of Israel, mainly of northern Israel, not including Jerusalem and the land of Judah, nor the 'foreign possessions' (verses 7–19). The geographical organization of the list is interesting: beginning with the central mountains of Ephraim, moving north (Naphtali, Asher, and Issachar) and concluding with the south and south-east (Benjamin and Gad).

Verse 6
"Adoniram": also mentioned in 1 Kings 5:14 and 12:18 where the name is spelled "Adoram" (cf. 2 Samuel 20:24); also spelled as "Hadoram" (2 Chronicles 10:18). He was stoned to death by the Israelites to whom Rehoboam sent him, as a collector of tribute, after the revolt of the ten tribes to Jeroboam.
"The tribute": or "forced labor" (NKJV), not the same as the Israelite labor force in 1 Kings 5:13 (cf. 1 Kings 11:28; 12:3–4).

Solomon's prosperity and wisdom (4:20–34)

Under Solomon, the kingdom prospered and had a security from the neighboring states from the Euphrates to Egypt, while the state administration had become larger and more centralized since the time of Saul. Verses 29–34 focus on Solomon's wisdom, a full circle of Solomon's history since 1 Kings 3:1–15, more on the academic aspect, instead of as a king or a judge. In Solomon's time, science was already international, with the texts of wisdom from the whole of the ancient Near East (as found in archaeology) containing accumulated general knowledge. Solomon is named as the author of the many proverbs (verse 32; Proverbs 10:1; 25:1; hence also 1:1) and songs (Psalm 72, Psalm 127; Song 1:1). He also has ability to enumerate creation in natural order (verse 33; cf. Job 38–39, Psalm 104, and Genesis 1).

See also

Related Bible parts: 2 Chronicles 1, Job 38, Job 39, Psalm 72, Psalm 88, Psalm 89, Psalm 127

Notes

References

Sources

External links
 Jewish translations:
 Melachim I - I Kings - Chapter 4 (Judaica Press). Hebrew text and English translation [with Rashi's commentary] at Chabad.org
 Christian translations:
 Online Bible at GospelHall.org (ESV, KJV, Darby, American Standard Version, Bible in Basic English)
 1 Kings chapter 4. Bible Gateway

04